Rimouski station is a Via Rail station in Rimouski, Quebec, Canada. It is located on Rue de l'Évèché, is staffed and wheelchair-accessible. Rimouski is served by Via Rail's Ocean and was served by Montreal–Gaspé train until the latter was suspended in 2013. Both trains shared the same rail line between Montreal and Matapédia.

External links

Via Rail page for the Ocean
Via Rail page for the Montreal – Gaspé train

Via Rail stations in Quebec
Buildings and structures in Rimouski
Railway stations in Bas-Saint-Laurent